Calamosternus is a genus of scarab beetles in the family Scarabaeidae. There are more than 20 described species in Calamosternus.

Species
These 23 species belong to the genus Calamosternus:

 Calamosternus acriculus (Balthasar, 1938)
 Calamosternus algiricus (Mariani & Pittino, 1983)
 Calamosternus boreosinicus (Červenka, 1994)
 Calamosternus ciliaticollis (Petrovitz, 1973)
 Calamosternus colimaensis (Hinton, 1934)
 Calamosternus descarpentriesi (Petrovitz, 1966)
 Calamosternus granarius (Linnaeus, 1767)
 Calamosternus hyxos (Petrovitz, 1962)
 Calamosternus machulkai (Balthasar, 1935)
 Calamosternus magnicollis (Petrovitz, 1969)
 Calamosternus mayeri (Pilleri, 1953)
 Calamosternus prusai (Tesař, 1945)
 Calamosternus pseudolucidus (Rakovič, 1977)
 Calamosternus sauteri (Petrovitz, 1961)
 Calamosternus srinagarensis (Pittino, 2001)
 Calamosternus stercorarius (Mulsant & Rey, 1870)
 Calamosternus subdolus (Petrovitz, 1962)
 Calamosternus tricornifrons (Reitter, 1909)
 Calamosternus trucidatus (Harold, 1863)
 Calamosternus unicolor (Olivier, 1789)
 Calamosternus uniplagiatus (Waterhouse, 1875)
 Calamosternus vexator (Balthasar, 1933)
 Calamosternus zmoskev (Červenka, 1994)

References

External links

 

Scarabaeidae
Scarabaeidae genera
Taxa named by Victor Motschulsky